Asha Aravind is an Indian model and film actress active in the Malayalam film industry.

Personal life
She was born at Changanassery, Kottayam. She is married to Aravind Ananthakrishnan Nair and has a daughter Akshaya.

Acting career
She started her modelling career in 2008 with an ad for Titan watches . She has appeared in more than 453 print and television campaigns of various brands including Nestle, Idea, Kalyan Jewellers, A Geeripai, M4marry.com, Kitchen treasures, Nirapara, Ujala, Jyothis, Allianz, Amcos, Anna Aluminium, Kosamattam Finance, Mr.Kwik, Bhima, KLM Gold Loan, LDF, Grihalakshmi, Byhand, Nana, Karshakasree, Dhathri, Asian Paints, Thriveni, Sabena, Sun Direct, Samsung, Minumix, Saras, Jayalakshmi, Mazhavil Manorama, ICICI Bank, HDFC Bank,  Colgate, Biz Analyst, nestle100 years ad, magi noodles, Asian game,Amirthaveni hair oil,seematti silk, jayalakshmi silks ,kadhabook with M S Dhoni ,etc.

She made her film debut in 2012 with the movie Arike.

Filmography
 TBA – Untitled Dr.Gangadharan's biopic movie 
 TBA - Sethu as Sainaba
 TBA – Bermuda
 TBA – Ajith From Aruppukottai - Tamil film
 2023 – Santhosham as Sindhu Sureshkumar
 2022 - Heaven as Lalitha
 2022 – Lalitham Sundaram  as Priya
 2021 – Kolaambi as Anju Sudharshan
 2021  – Home as Joseph's wife 
 2021 - Ice Orathi as Asha
 2019 – My Great Grandfather as Pooja
 2019 – Mera Naam Shaji as Mini Dominic
 2019 – Sakalakalashala as Mymuna  
 2018 – Mohanlal as Dr. Parvathy
 2018 – Kalyanam as Rukmini
 2017 – Pullikkaran Staraa as Sophy Stephen
 2017 – Basheerinte Premalekhanam as Saramma
 2016 – Kattappanayile Rithwik Roshan as Jessy
 2015 – Kumbasaram as School Teacher
 2015 – Swargathekkal Sundaram as Jalaja
 2014 – Vegam as Nancy
 2013 – Lokpal as Dr. Elizabeth
 2013 – Miss Lekha Tharoor Kaanunnathu as Lekha's sister 
 2013 – Annayum Rasoolum as Rosy
 2012 – Friday as chitra
 2012 – Arike as Vinayan's wife

References

 http://www.cochintalkies.com/celebrity/asha-aravind.html
 http://imagess.southdreamz.in/?s=asha+aravind
 https://www.youtube.com/watch?v=vda0g3VAZqg
 http://cinetrooth.in/2016/01/02/asha-aravind-actress-profile-and-biography/

External links
 
 http://www.deccanchronicle.com/151029/lifestyle-offbeat/article/it-takes-less-two-minutes-smile
 http://www.deccanchronicle.com/151213/entertainment-mollywood/article/long-and-short-it

Actresses from Kerala
Living people
People from Changanassery
Actresses in Malayalam cinema
Actresses in Malayalam television
Indian film actresses
21st-century Indian actresses
Date of birth missing (living people)
Year of birth missing (living people)